Keith Robert Krepfle (born February 4, 1952) is a former American football tight end who played for eight seasons in the National Football League for the Philadelphia Eagles and Atlanta Falcons.

College career

During his three-year career at Iowa State, Krepfle dominated the Big Eight. He hauled in 94 passes for 1,368 yards and 15 touchdowns in addition to playing in two bowl games. His inaugural Cyclone season Krepfle led the team to their first ever bowl game, the 1971 Sun Bowl. The next season, Keith would again lead the Cyclones to a bowl berth with the 1972 Liberty Bowl. Krepfle's best collegiate game was against #3 Nebraska during the 1972 season in which he caught two touchdowns.

While at Iowa State, Keith was a member of the fraternity Tau Kappa Epsilon.

In 2002 he was inducted into the Iowa State Cyclones Hall of Fame.

Professional career

Despite being drafted in the fifth round of the 1974 NFL Draft by the Philadelphia Eagles, Krepfle chose to sign with the Jacksonville Sharks of the World Football League.  All-pro tight end Charle Young was already entrenched with Eagles and the Sharks offered Krepfle a guaranteed contract. Just 14 games into the season the Sharks went bankrupt and the team folded.  The following season Krepfle signed a contract with the Eagles to play in the NFL.

After limited playing time his first two seasons with the Eagles, Charle Young was traded to the Los Angeles Rams for QB Ron Jaworski prior to the 1977 season.  This created an opening for Krepfle to shine.  As a full-time starter for the Eagles, Krepfle would have over 150 catches for nearly 2,500 yards and 19 touchdowns. Keith became the first Eagle to ever catch a touch down in the Super Bowl during their appearance in Super Bowl XV.

Following seven seasons with the Eagles, Krepfle played one additional season with the Atlanta Falcons.

Statistics

Regular season

Playoffs season

Post-NFL career

After his NFL career, Krepfle embarked on a career in the health care industry, working for large pharmaceutical companies such as Novartis, Bristol Myers Squibb and Delta Pharma before starting his own company.  Today he lives in the Poconos in Pennsylvania.

References

1952 births
Living people
Sportspeople from Dubuque, Iowa
People from Potosi, Wisconsin
Players of American football from Iowa
Players of American football from Wisconsin
American football tight ends
Iowa State Cyclones football players
Philadelphia Eagles players
Atlanta Falcons players
Jacksonville Sharks (WFL) players